Graeme Smith is a retired South African cricketer who played international cricket between 2002 and 2014. In a career spanning 12 years, he made centuries (100 or more runs in a single innings) on 27 and 10 occasions in Test and One Day International (ODI) matches respectively. His tally of 37 international centuries places him only behind Jacques Kallis (62), Hashim Amla (53) and AB de Villiers (45) among his countrymen, as of October 2016.

Smith made his Test and ODI debuts against Australia during the 2001–02 home series. His maiden century—200 against Bangladesh—came in October 2002. During South Africa's tour of England in 2003, he scored double centuries—277 at Edgbaston and 259 at Lord's—in consecutive Tests. Smith's performances in the season led to him being named one of the five Wisden Cricketers of the Year in 2004. His three centuries in consecutive Tests were instrumental in ensuring South Africa's series win against the West Indies in 2005. In Tests, Smith made centuries against all teams except India and Sri Lanka. He was most successful against England with seven centuries. With five double centuries he leads the list among South African cricketers as of May 2014. As of October 2015, Smith's four centuries in the fourth innings of a Test match is the second highest by any player, only behind Younus Khan, who has scored five centuries in the fourth innings of a Test. Of his 27 Test centuries, 25 came while captaining the side, and South Africa lost none of its matches on any such instance.

Smith's first ODI century came in 2005, three years after his international debut. He went on to score four more centuries the same year, the second-most in a calendar year by a South African. Smith's highest score in ODIs was 141, which he made against England in September 2009. In ODIs, he made centuries against eight different opponents, with three of them scored at venues outside South Africa. Between his debut Twenty20 International and final one in 2005, Smith played 33 matches in the format without scoring a century; his highest score of 89 not out was made against Australia in February 2006.

Key

Test centuries

One-Day International centuries

Footnotes

References 

South African cricket lists
Smith, Graeme